Kamelia Dunavska (born 21 April 1969) is a Bulgarian female former rhythmic gymnast and trainer. She is the head coach of the Turkey rhythmic gymnastics national team.

Kamelia Dunavska won gold medals at the 1987 World Championships held in Varna, Bulgaria and at the 1988 European Championships in Helsinki, Finland. Her twin sister Adriana is also a rhythmic gymnastiast.

After retiring from active sports, she became a coach in rhythmic gymnastics. For a short period, she served as coach of the Bulgarian national ensemble.

She was appointed head coach of the Turkey national team. She keeps residing in her country, goes to Turkey to coach the national team for sometimes a month and sometimes two weeks a month. The Turkish team, she coached, won the gold medal in the 3 Hoops + 4 Clubs event at the 2020 European Championships held in Ukraine.

References

1969 births
Living people
Gymnasts from Sofia
Bulgarian sportswomen
Bulgarian rhythmic gymnasts
Bulgarian expatriate sportspeople in Turkey